Alvin Frankenberg (December 30, 1923 – June 25, 2011) was an American lawyer and Liberal Party of New York politician who served as Queens New York City Council councilman-at-large as a Democrat from 1970 to 1973.

A Bronx, New York native, Frankenberg enlisted in the United States Marine Corps during World War II. Upon returning from the war he enrolled in City College of New York, he received a law degree from New York Law School and started his own law practice. From 1970 to 1973 he served in the New York City Council. He also served as a Deputy Commissioner of the New York State Department of Motor Vehicles, counsel to the speaker of the New York Assembly, and as a New York City Marshal.

References 

1923 births
2011 deaths
Jewish American military personnel
United States Marine Corps personnel of World War II
City College of New York alumni
Liberal Party of New York politicians
Marshals
New York City Council members
New York Law School alumni
People from Queens, New York
People from the Bronx
United States Marines
20th-century American lawyers
21st-century American Jews